
This is a list of J-pop artists and groups. Originally an evolution of jazz, and coined New Music, the style went on to become known as City Pop, music with an urban theme. Later called Japan-made Pop, the term was shortened to J-pop and now encompasses a wide range of musical styles and genres. J-pop represents modern pop culture music originating from the country or musical talent of Japan.

!–9

°C-ute
10,000 Promises.
175R
19
22/7
2BACKKA
3B LAB.☆
7 HOUSE
9nine
&TEAM

A

Aa!
AAA
Abe, Mao
Abe, Natsumi
 AbeRyo
Abe, Yasuhiro
Abe, Yoshiharu
Access
 Acid Black Cherry
Aco
Ado
Ai
Aiba, Masaki
Aida, Shoko
Aikawa, Hiroki
Aikawa, Nanase
Aiko
Aimer
Aimyon
Air
Aira, Mitsuki
Aiso, Haruhi
Aiuchi, Rina
Ajico
Akanishi, Jin
Akashi, Momoka
AKB48
Akeboshi
Akishibu Project
Aki, Angela
Akiyama, Satoko
Alan
The Alfee
Ali Project
Alma Kaminiito
Ami Suzuki
Amiaya
Amuro, Namie
Anai, Yuko
Angela
Angerme
Anly
Anna S
Anzenchitai
Aonishi, Takashi
Aoyama, Thelma
Aqua Timez
Aragaki, Yui
Arashi
Arashiro, Beni
Arioka, Daiki
Asakura, Daisuke
Asaoka, Megumi
Asian Kung-Fu Generation
Atarashii Gakko!
Ayabie
Ayaka
Ayana
AZU

B

B'z
Babamania
BaBe
Babymetal
Back-On
Back Number
Bakusute Sotokanda Icchome
Base Ball Bear
BeForU
Bennie K
Berryz Koubou
Beyooooonds
Bis
Bish
Bluem of Youth
BoA
Bon-Bon Blanco
Bonnie Pink
Boys and Men
Bright
The Brilliant Green
Bullet Train
bump.y
Bump of Chicken
Buono!
Buzy

C

Candies
Capsule
Carry Loose
CHAGE and ASKA
Changin' My Life
Chara
Charcoal Filter
Chatmonchy
Chemistry
Che'Nelle
Cheeky Parade
Chiba, Saeko
Chihara, Minori
Chinen, Rina
Chinen, Yuri
The Cinderella Project  
ClariS
Clear's
Coconuts Musume
College Cosmos
Cool Joke
CooRie
Core of Soul
Country Musume
Crystal Kay
CY8ER
CYNHN

D

D-51
D&D
D DATE
Da-iCE
Da Pump
DAOKO
Danceroid
Dancing Dolls
Naniwa Danshi
Day After Tomorrow
Deen
Dempagumi.inc
DEPAPEPE
Dicot
Dish
Diva
Dizon, Leah
DJ Ozma
Do As Infinity
Dohzi-T
Dōmoto, Kōichi
Dōmoto, Tsuyoshi
Dream
Dream Morning Musume
Dreams Come True
DRM

E

E-girls
E.mu
Earth
Ebichu
Eightranger
Eito
Elisa
Empire
Emyli
Eto, Rie
Etsuko Yakushimaru
Eu Phoria
E ve
Every Little Thing
EXILE

F

Fairies
Faky
Favorite Blue
Faylan
Fayray
FictionJunction Yuuka
Field of View
Flap Girls' School
Flipper's Guitar
FLOW
flumpool
Folder 5
Four Leaves
French Kiss
fripSide
Fu, Rie
Fujii, Fumiya
Fukada, Kyoko
Fukuda, Saki
Fukusaki, Eric
Fukuyama, Masaharu
Funky Monkey Babys
Furukawa, Yūta
Fuzzy Control

G

Gackt
Gang Parade
Garnet Crow
Generations from Exile Tribe
Girl Next Door
Glay
Globe
Go-Bang's
Godiego
Gold, Taro
Golden Bomber
Goto, Maki
Go to the Beds
GReeeeN
Guardians 4

H

H-wonder
Hajime, Chitose
Hal
HALCALI
Hamada, Mari
Hamasaki, Ayumi
Hanazawa, Kana
hANGRY&ANGRY
Yuko Hara
Harada, Shinji
Haruna, Luna
Hata, Motohiro
Hatsune Miku
Hayashi, Asuca
Hayashi, Nobutoshi
Hayashibara, Megumi
Hearts Grow
Heartsdales
Hello! Project All Stars
Hey! Say! JUMP
High-King
Hikashu
Himeka
Hinatazaka46
Ken Hirai 
Hinoi, Asuka
Hinoi Team
Hinouchi, Emi
Hirahara, Ayaka
Hirai, Ken
Hirano, Aya
Hirose, Kōmi
Hisakawa, Aya
Hitomi
Hitoto, Yō
HKT48
Hōkago Princess
Ho-kago Tea Time
Home Made Kazoku
Honda, Minako
Horie, Mitsuko
Horie, Yui
Hoshimura, Mai
Gen Hoshino
Hotch Potchi
HY
Hysteric Blue

I
I WiSH
Ice Creamusume
Iceman
Ichii, Sayaka
Idol College
Idol Renaissance
Idoling!!!
Iijima, Mari
Iizuka, Mayumi
Ikeda, Ayako
Ikimonogakari
Imai, Miki
Inaba, Koshi
The Indigo
INI
Inoo, Kei
Inoue, Kazuhiko
Inoue, Kikuko
Irino, Miyu
Ishida, Yoko
Ishii, Tatsuya
Ishikawa, Chiaki
Ishikawa, Rika
Isoya, Yuki
Itano, Tomomi
Itō, Yuna
Iwata, Sayuri
i☆Ris
Iz*One

J
J Soul Brothers
JAM Project
Janne Da Arc
Jasmine
Jay'ed
Jero
JO1
Johnny's West
Judy and Mary
Juice=Juice
JUJU
June
Jungle Smile
Jyongri
Jyukai

K

K
Kageyama, Hironobu
Kahala, Tomomi
Kahimi Karie
kalafina
Kaji, Meiko
Kamiki, Aya
Kazuya Kamenashi
Kame to Yamapi
Kanjani Eight
Kanno, Yoko
KAT-TUN
 KEN☆Tackey
Katakiri, Rekka
Kato, Miliyah
Kawabe, Chieko
Kawada, Mami
Kawase, Tomoko
Kawashima, Ai
Kawasumi, Ayako
Kayo, Aiko
Ketsumeishi
Keyakizaka46
Kick the Can Crew
Kids Alive
Kikkawa, Kōji
kitaro
Kimeru
Kimura, Kaela
King Gnu
King & Prince
KinKi Kids
Kotani, Kinya
Kirinji
Kitaro
Kis-my-ft2
Kishimoto, Hayami
Kitade, Nana
Kiyokiba Shunsuke
Kiyotaka Sugiyama
Kobukuro
Kōda, Kumi
Kōda, Mariko
Kokia
Kolme
Komatsu, Miho
Kome Kome Club
Kosaka, Riyu
KOTOKO
Koyanagi, Yuki
Kudo, Shizuka
Kumaki, Anri
Kuraki, Mai
Kuroki, Meisa
Kushida, Akira
Kusumi, Koharu
Kuwata, Keisuke
Kyary Pamyu Pamyu

L
 
L'Arc~en~Ciel
Ladybaby
Last Idol
Lead
Leo Ieiri
Lia
Lindberg
Ling tosite Sigure
LiSA (Japanese musician, born 1987)
Little by Little
Little Glee Monster
LM.C
Love
Love Psychedelico
Lufkin, Olivia
=Love

M

 
M-Flo
Maeda, Ai
Maeda, Atsuko
Maeda, Yuki
Magnolia Factory
Mai
Maison Book Girl
Makihara, Noriyuki
Makino, Yui
Mameshiba no Taigun
Mano, Erina
marble
Masuda, Keiko
Masuda, Yuri
Matsu, Takako
Matsuda, Seiko
Matsui Jurina
Matsui Rena
Matsumoto, Jun
Matsushita, Yuya
Matsutoya, Yumi
Matsuura, Aya
Mawatari, Matsuko
MAX
May J.
May'n
Mell
Mellow Mellow
Melocure
melody.
Melon Kinenbi
Metis
MiChi
Mie
mihimaru GT
Nana Mizuki
MilkyWay
Minawo
Minekawa, Takako
Mini Moni
Mink
Minmi
MIQ
Misato, Aki
Misia
misono
Miura, Daichi
Miyano, Mamoru
Miyavi
Miyazaki, Ayumi
Shinji Miyazaki
Miz
Mizca
Mizuki, Nana
Momoi, Haruko
MONGOL800
MONKEY MAJIK
Moriguchi, Hiroko
Morikawa, Miho
Moritaka, Chisato
Moriyama, Naotarō
Momoiro Clover Z
Monkey Majik
Morning Musume
Motohiro Hata
moumoon
m.o.v.e
Mr. Children
Myco
My Little Lover

N
Nakagawa, Shōko
Nakahara, Mai
Nakajima, Miyuki
Nakajima, Yuto
Nakamori, Akina
Nakanishi, Toshio
Nakashima, Mika
Nakayama, Miho
Nakayama, Uri
Nakayama, Yuma
Natsukawa, Rimi
Nemuri, Haru
NEWS
Matsuri Nine
Ninomiya, Kazunari
Nishikawa, Takanori
Nishino, Kana
NiziU
NGT48
NMB48
no3b
Nobodyknows+
Nogizaka46
Nomiya, Maki
Not yet
NYC
N Zero

O
Oda, Kazumasa
Odani, Misako
Official Hige Dandism
Ogata, Megumi
Ogura, Kei
Ohguro, Maki
Ohno, Satoshi
Okada, Yukiko
Okamoto, Keito
Okazaki, Ritsuko
Okuda, Tamio
Okui, Masami
Onitsuka, Chihiro
Ono, Erena 
Ono, Lisa 
On/Off
OnePixcel
Orange Pekoe
ORANGE RANGE
Oshima, Hanako
Oshima, Yuko
Oshio, Kotaro
Otsuka, Ai
Ozaki, Ami
Ozaki, Yutaka
Ozawa, Kenji

P

Paradises
Paris match
Pasocom Music Club
Passcode (group)
Passpo
Perfume
Piggs
Piko
PINK CRES.
Pink Lady
Pistol Valve
Pizzicato Five
Plastics
Porno Graffitti
The Possible
Princess Princess
PrizmaX
Prizmmy☆
Psychic Lover
PUFFY

Q
Quruli

R
Rag Fair
Rake
Rats & Star
Ray
Naoto Inti Raymi
Remioromen
 Repesen Foxx
Rinoie, Joe
Rip Slyme
RIRI
Romantic Mode
Round Table
Royz
Run Girls, Run!
Run&Gun

Rurutia

Rythem
Ryutist

S

S/mileage
Sada, Masashi
Saiga, Mitsuki
Saijo, Hideki
Saito, Yuki
Sakai, Mikio
Sakai, Noriko
Sakakibara, Yui
Sakamoto, Kyu
Sakamoto, Maaya
Sakamoto, Miu
Sakamoto, Ryuichi
Sakura Gakuin
Sakurai, Sho
Sakurai, Tomo
Sakurazaka46
Salyu
Sandaime J Soul Brothers
Sandii & the Sunsetz
Sano, Motoharu
Saori@destiny
Sashihara, Rino
Satō, Hiromi
savage genius
Sayuri
Sid
SAWA
Sawada, Kenji
Erika Sawajiri
SCANDAL
The Scanty
School Food Punishment
SDN48
Seagull Screaming Kiss Her Kiss Her
Seamo
See-Saw
Sekai no Owari
Sexy Zone
Sharam Q
Shibasaki, Kou
Shibata, Jun
Subaru Shibutani
Shiina, Ringo
Shimabukuro, Hiroko
Shimamiya, Eiko
Shimatani, Hitomi 
Shimizu, Ai
Shota Shimizu
Shimokawa, Mikuni
Shinohara, Tomoe
Shintani Ryōko
Shiritsu Ebisu Chugaku 
Shirota, Yū
Shishido, Rumi
Shugo Chara Egg!
Shuchishin
Sifow
Silent Siren
SixTones
SKE48
SMAP
Snow
Snow Man
Sonim
Sophia
Sora tob sakana
SoulJa
Sowelu
SPEED
Spitz
 ST☆RISH 
Stereopony
Suga, Shikao
Straightener
Sukima Switch
Sunmyu
Sunny Day Service
SunSet Swish
Super Girls
Super Monkey's
Supercar
supercell
Superfly
Suzuki, Airi
Suzuki, Ami
Suzuki, Masayuki
Suzumura, Kenichi
SweetS

T

T-Bolan
Tackey and Tsubasa
Tadokoro, Azusa
Tainaka, Sachi
Takahashi, Hitomi
Takahashi, Minami
Takahashi, Naozumi
Takahashi, Yoko
Takaki, Yuya
Tamaki, Nami
Tamura, Eriko
Tamura, Yukari
Tamurapan
Tanimura Nana
Tanaka, Rie
Tange, Sakura
Tanpopo
Team Syachihoko
Tegomass
Teriyaki Boyz
Terra
Teshima, Aoi
Tetsuya
Teresa Teng
TiA
tiaraway
The World Standard
TM Network
T.M.Revolution
Tofubeats
Togawa, Jun
東方神起
Tokio (band)
Tokumaru, Shugo
Tokyo Girls' Style
Tokyo Jihen
Toru Kitajima
TRF
TrySail
Tsuchiya, Anna
Tsuchiya, Masami
Tsunku
Tsuyuzaki, Harumi (Lyrico)
Tube (band)
Twinklestars
Two-Mix
Twice

U

U-ka saegusa IN db
UA
Uchida, Maaya
Uchida, Yuki
Uehara, Azumi
Uehara, Takako
Kana Uemura
Uijin
Ulfuls
Unison Square Garden
Utada, Hikaru
Utatsuki, Kaori
Ukka
Utoku, Keiko
Uverworld

V
v-u-den 
V6
Valshe
Van, Tomiko
Vaundy
ViViD

W
W
w-inds.
Wada, Kōji
Wagakki Band
WANDS
WaT
Watanabe, Mayu
Watanabe, Misato
Watarirouka Hashiritai
Weather Girls
White Ash
Whiteberry
WHY@DOLL
Wink
Wino
Wyse

Y
Ya-ya-yah
Yabu, Kota
Yaida, Hitomi
Yamada, Keiko
Yamada, Ryosuke
Yamaguchi, Momoe
Yamashita, Tatsuro
Yamashita, Tomohisa
Yamazaki, Masayoshi
Yanagi, Nagi
Yano, Maki
Yaotome, Hikaru
Yazumi, Kana
Yellow Generation
Yoasobi
Yoji Biomehanika
Yonekura, Chihiro
Kenshi Yonezu
Yorico
Yorushika
Yōsei Teikoku
Yoshida, Miwa
Yoshida, Takuro
You'll Melt More!
Younha
YUI
YUKA
Yukana
Yuki
Yuko Anai
Yuma Nakayama w/B.I.Shadow
Yumemiru Adolescence
Yuna Ito
YURIA
Yusa, Mimori
Yuzu
Yumi Shizukusa

Z
ZARD
Zebra Queen
Zenbu Kimi no Sei da.
ZOC
Zone
Zoo
ZYX
ZZ

See also
List of musical artists from Japan
List of Bemani musicians

References 

Lists of musicians by genre
Lists of Japanese musicians
J-pop